Vimukthi Umagiliyage (born 13 August 1992) is a Sri Lankan cricketer. He made his List A debut for Kandy Customs Cricket Club in the 2018–19 Premier Limited Overs Tournament on 4 March 2019.

References

External links
 

1992 births
Living people
Sri Lankan cricketers
Kandy Customs Sports Club cricketers
Place of birth missing (living people)